Irén Hönsch (born 24 May 1932), also Jenőné Sillye (1957-1972) and Lajosné Károly (from 1972), was a Hungarian chess player. She was a three-time winner of the Hungarian Women's Chess Championship (1957, 1959, 1960).

Biography
In the 1950s and the 1960s, Irén Hönsch was one of the leading Hungarian women's chess players. She won in Hungarian Women's Chess Championships in 1957, 1959 and 1960.

Irén Hönsch played for Hungary in the Women's Chess Olympiads:
 In 1957, at first board in the 1st Chess Olympiad (women) in Emmen.

In 1957, she married Hungarian chess master Jenő Sillye. The couple had two sons: Gábor (born 1959) and Kálmán (born 1960). From her second marriage with Lajos Károly, she had a daughter Irén (born 1973).

References

1932 births
Sportspeople from Košice
Hungarian female chess players
Chess Olympiad competitors
Living people